Wath Brow Hornets are an amateur rugby league football club from Cleator Moor, Cumbria. The club currently competes in the top division of the National Conference League. The club also operates a number of academy teams.

History

The game of rugby of one sorts or another has been played in the Wath Brow area of Cleator Moor for many a long year, Prior to the great breakaway in 1895 there was a rugby union team with the name now associated to the rugby league club.

The original Wath Brow RL, or Northern Union as it was originally known, was founded in 1898, when a Mr. Wilson represented Cumberland in the first ever County Championship against Cheshire.

Rugby football had been played in the Wath Brow area of Cleator Moor for many years before the schism of 1895. The original Hornets club was formed in 1898, just a few years after the breakaway and decided to play the northern union code of rugby. The club disbanded in 1904.

A new club with the same name was formed in 1920. This club however, disbanded at the start of World War II in 1939.

The current incarnation of the club was formed in 1955 and joined the National Conference League in 2002.

Former notable players
Leroy Joe,

James Donaldson (rugby league)

Honours
 National Conference League Premier Division
Winners (1): 2012, 2019
 National Conference League Premier Division
 Winners (1): 2003–04, 2008–09
 National Conference League Division Two
 Winners (1): 2002–03
 BARLA National Cup
 Winners (2): 2003–04, 2004–05
 BARLA Cumbria Cup
 Winners (4): 1998–99, 1999–2000, 2000–01, 2001–02
 Cumberland League
Winners (6): 1975-76, 1976-75, 1997–98, 1999-00, 2000–01, 2001–02

References

External links
Official website
The Hornets on the NCL website

Rugby league teams in Cumbria
BARLA teams
Rugby clubs established in 1898
Rugby clubs established in 1920
Rugby clubs established in 1955
1898 establishments in England
English rugby league teams